WYM, or wym, may refer to:

 WYM editor, an open-source WYSIWYM text editor for editing content on web pages
 wym, the ISO 639-3 code for the Wymysorys language spoken in the town of Wilamowice, Poland
 WYM, the National Rail code for Wylam railway station in Northumberland, UK

See also